The Hunt for the Unicorn Killer is a thriller/drama TV film that first aired on NBC in 1999 as a two-part miniseries.

It starred Kevin Anderson, Naomi Watts and Tom Skerritt. Anderson plays 1970s activist and purported Earth Day co-founder Ira Einhorn, who is charged with, and later convicted in absentia of, the murder of his girlfriend Holly Maddux (played by Watts). Skerritt plays Maddux's father, who tries to bring Einhorn to justice.

Cast

Kevin Anderson as Ira Einhorn
Tom Skerritt as Fred Maddux
Naomi Watts as Holly Maddux
Kellie Overbey as Meg Maddux
Ruben Santiago-Hudson as Detective Newhouse
Brian Kerwin as Saul Lapidus
Josef Sommer as Corporate Man
William G. Schilling as Robert Stevens
Albert Schultz as Lucas Rothman
Mimi Kuzyk as Barbra Bronfman
Gregory Itzin as Arlen Specter
Rosemary Murphy as Bea Einhorn
Bill MacDonald as Police Lieutenant
Martin Donovan as Richard DiBenedetto
Wanda Cannon as Liz Maddux
Kristin Booth as Buffy Maddux
Angela Vint as Mary Maddux
Kirby Morrow as John Maddux
Rosemary Dunsmore as Holly's Counselor
Damir Andrei as Book Editor
Philippe Ayoub as Mitchell Snyder (as Philip Ayoub)
Marcia Bennett as Judge's Secretary
Catherine Blythe as Café Manager
Robert Bockstael as Professor
Nicu Branzea as Andrua Puharich
Ian D. Clark  as Denis Weaire
Gina Clayton as Joann DiBenedetto
Matt Cooke as Harry Jay Katz
Susan Coyne as Sandra Rothman
Jon Cubrt as Paul Herre
Yuval Daniel as Uri Geller
Hugo Dann as Investigator #1
Louis Di Bianco as Mayor Frank Rizzo
Martin Doyle as Enquirer Reporter
Reg Dreger as Governor Tom Ridge
Carolyn Dunn as Anika Flodin
Roger Dunn as Harvard Dean
Donna Goodhand as Head D.A.
Ron Hartmann as Judge Foley
Niki Holt as Nina (as Nicole Hughes)
Maggie Huculak as Social Worker
Jeffrey Knight as T.V. Reporter
Louisa Martin as Colette Weaire
Bruce McFee as FBI Supervisor
Deborah Pollitt as Co-Op Worker
Michael Rhoades as Bernard Segal
Elisabeth Rosen as Jean Marie
Richard Sali as Morris Gelman
Kim Schraner as Shelly
Jacques Tourangeau as Dominique Tricaud
Nicole Underhay as Dorm Roommate
Robin Ward as Debate Moderator
Jennifer Wigmore as Rita Siegel
Kim Roberts as Jury Foreperson
Kim Poirier as Affair Girl (scenes deleted) (uncredited)

External links

1999 television films
1999 films
Films shot in Toronto
NBC network original films
1990s thriller drama films
Films directed by William Graham (director)
American thriller drama films
American thriller television films
Films produced by Arnon Milchan
1990s American films